Kamianka, until May 2016 Kuibysheve and until October 2021 Bilmak is an urban-type settlement in Polohy Raion of Zaporizhzhia Oblast in Ukraine. It is located in the eastern part of the oblast. Population: 

On 21 May 2016, Verkhovna Rada adopted decision to rename Kuibysheve Raion to Bilmak Raion and Kuibysheve to Bilmak according to the law prohibiting names of Communist origin.

On 6 October 2021, Verkhovna Rada adopted decision to rename Bilmak to Kamianka.

Economy

Transportation
The settlement is on Highway H08 connecting Zaporizhzhia and Mariupol.

It has connections to Zaporizhzhia, Volnovakha, and Berdiansk. There is passenger traffic through the station.

References

Urban-type settlements in Polohy Raion